Chicago Union Stock Yards fire (1910), 21 firefighters and 3 civilians killed
 Chicago Union Stock Yards fire (1934), second-most destructive Chicago fire in terms of property loss